Lectern Peak is a  mountain summit located in Alberta, Canada.

Description
Lectern Peak is set within Jasper National Park, in the Trident Range of the Canadian Rockies. The nearest higher neighbor is Aquila Mountain,  to the south. The peak is visible from the Icefields Parkway to the east. Precipitation runoff from Lectern Peak drains into Portal Creek and Astoria River which are both tributaries of the Athabasca River. Topographic relief is significant as the summit rises 900 meters (2,950 feet) above the creek in two kilometers (1.2 mile). A partial ascent of the mountain was made in 1913 by Geoffrey E. Howard who named the peak for its resemblance to a church lectern. He was accompanied by Arnold L. Mumm and Moritz Inderbinen on the expedition. The mountain's toponym was officially adopted March 5, 1935, by the Geographical Names Board of Canada.

Climate

Based on the Köppen climate classification, Lectern Peak is located in a subarctic climate zone with cold, snowy winters, and mild summers. Winter temperatures can drop below -20 °C with wind chill factors below -30 °C.

Geology

The mountain is composed of sedimentary rock laid down during the Precambrian to Jurassic periods and pushed east and over the top of younger rock during the Laramide orogeny.

See also
 
 Geography of Alberta

References

External links
 Parks Canada web site: Jasper National Park
 Lectern Peak: weather forecast

Two-thousanders of Alberta
Mountains of Jasper National Park
Canadian Rockies
Alberta's Rockies